Christianity in Turkey has a long history dating back to the early origins of Christianity in Asia Minor during the 1st century AD. In modern times the percentage of Christians in Turkey has declined from 20 to 25 percent in 1914 to 3–5.5 percent in 1927, to 0.3–0.4%, roughly translating to 200,000–320,000 devotees. The percentage of Christians in Turkey fell mainly as a result of the late Ottoman genocides (the Armenian genocide, Greek genocide, and Assyrian genocide), the population exchange between Greece and Turkey, the emigration of Christians that began in the late 19th century and gained pace in the first quarter of the 20th century, and due to events such as the 1942 Varlık Vergisi tax levied on non-Muslim citizens in Turkey and the 1955 Istanbul pogrom against Christian Greeks and Armenians. Exact numbers are difficult to estimate as many former Muslim converts to Christianity often hide their Christian faith for fear of familial pressure, religious discrimination, and persecution.

This was due to events which had a significant impact on the country's demographic structure, such as the First World War, the genocides of Greeks, Armenians, and Assyrians perpetrated by Turkish Muslims, and the population exchange between Greece and Turkey, and the emigration of Christians (such as Assyrians, Greeks, Armenians, etc.) to foreign countries (mostly in Europe and the Americas) that actually began in the late 19th century and gained pace in the first quarter of the 20th century, especially during World War I.

Today, there are more than 200,000–320,000 people of different Christian denominations, representing roughly 0.3–0.4 percent of Turkey's population, including an estimated 80,000 population of Oriental Orthodox Christians, 47,000 Turkish Orthodox Christians, 35,000 Roman Catholic Christians, 18,000 Antiochian Greeks, 5,000 Greek Orthodox Christians, 8,000 Protestant Christians, 4,994 Jehovah's Witnesses, and 512 Mormons. There is also a small group of ethnic Orthodox-Christian Turks (mostly living in Istanbul and Izmir) who follow the Greek Orthodox, Turkish Orthodox, or Syriac Orthodox churches, and additionally Protestant Turks who still face difficulties regarding social acceptance, and also historic claims to churches or property in the country because they are former Muslim converts to Christianity from Turkish-Muslim backgrounds (rather than ethnic minorities). Ethnically Turkish Protestants number around 7,000–8,000. In 2009, there were 236 Christian churches open for worship in Turkey. The Eastern Orthodox Church has been headquartered in Constantinople since the 4th century AD.

Historical background

Early Christianity

The Christianization of ancient Arameans and Armenians most likely began around the 1st century AD. The spread of Christianity beyond Jerusalem is discussed in the Book of Acts.

The Cappadocian Fathers produced some of the earliest hagiographies in the region. In addition to writings about feminine virtue by Gregory of Nyssa and Gregory of Nazianzos, later texts about Nicholas of Sion and Theodore of Sykeon described miracles and rural life.

The historical region of Syria became one of the main centers of miaphisite Christianity, embodied in the Oriental Orthodoxy, which had accepted only the first three ecumenical councils: Nicaea (325), Constantinople (381) and Ephesus (431). Miaphisite Christians were strongly opposed to Chalcedonian Creed that had been established by the Council of Chalcedon in 451. In the 5th and 6th centuries, the Syriac Orthodox Church that originated in Antioch continued to fracture into multiple denominations. Some Armenian miaphysite Christians sought to reunite with Rome in later centuries, but their efforts were unsuccessful.

Constantinople is generally considered to be the center and the "cradle of Orthodox Christian civilization". From the mid-5th century to the early 13th century, Constantinople was the largest and wealthiest city in Europe. The city became famous for its architectural masterpieces, such as Hagia Sophia, the cathedral of the Eastern Orthodox Church, which served as the seat of the Ecumenical Patriarchate, the sacred Imperial Palace where the Emperors lived, the Hippodrome, the Golden Gate of the Land Walls, and opulent aristocratic palaces.  The University of Constantinople was founded in the fifth century and contained artistic and literary treasures before it was sacked in 1204 and 1453, including its vast Imperial Library which contained the remnants of the Library of Alexandria and had 100,000 volumes.  The city was the home of the Ecumenical Patriarch of Constantinople and guardian of Christendom's holiest relics such as the Crown of thorns and the True Cross. During most of its existence, the Byzantine Empire was one of the most powerful economic, cultural, and military forces in Europe. The imperial role in the affairs of the Church never developed into a fixed, legally defined system. Additionally, due to the decline of Rome and internal dissension in the other Eastern Patriarchates, the Church of Constantinople became, between the 6th and 11th centuries, the richest and most influential centre of Christendom.

The Eastern Orthodox Church split from Rome during the Great Schism of 1054. With the arrival of the crusaders many Orthodox bishops, particularly in Antioch, were replaced by Latin prelates. After the Mongols defeated the Abbasid Caliphate in 1258, the Armenians and Nestorians had decent relations with the conquering Il-khans for a time, but by the end of the 14th-century many Syrian Orthodox and Nestorian churches were destroyed when the Turco-Mongolian ruler Temür raided West Asia.

Two out of the five centers (Patriarchates) of the ancient Pentarchy are in Turkey: Constantinople (Istanbul) and Antioch (Antakya). Antioch was also the place where the followers of Jesus were called "Christians" for the first time in history, as well as being the site of one of the earliest and oldest surviving churches, established by Saint Peter himself. For a thousand years, the Hagia Sophia was the largest church in the world.

Turkey is also home to the Seven Churches of Asia, where the Revelation to John was sent. Apostle John is reputed to have taken Virgin Mary to Ephesus in western Turkey, where she spent the last days of her life in a small house, known as the House of the Virgin Mary, which still survives today and has been recognized as a holy site for pilgrimage by the Catholic and Orthodox churches, as well as being a Muslim shrine. The cave of the Seven Sleepers is also located in Ephesus.

The death of the Forty Martyrs of Sebaste (modern day Sivas) is recorded as 320 AD during a persecution by Emperor Licinius. They are mentioned by Basil, Gregory of Nyssa, Ephrem the Syrian and John Chrysostom.

Ottoman Empire

In accordance with the traditional custom of the time, the Ottoman sultan Mehmed II allowed his troops and his entourage three full days of unbridled pillage and looting in the Christian city of Constantinople, capital of the Roman Empire since its foundation by the Roman Emperor Constantine the Great in the 4th century AD, shortly after it was captured in 1453. Once the three days passed, he would then claim its remaining contents for himself. However, by the end of the first day, he proclaimed that the looting should cease as he felt profound sadness when he toured the looted and enslaved city. The cathedral of Hagia Sophia was not exempted from the pillage and looting and specifically became its focal point, as the Ottoman Turks believed it to contain the greatest treasures and valuables of the city. Shortly after the defence of the Walls of Constantinople, the city collapsed and the Ottoman troops entered victoriously; the pillagers and looters made their way to the Hagia Sophia and battered down its doors before storming in.

Throughout the period of the siege of Constantinople, the trapped Christian worshippers of the city participated in the Divine Liturgy and the Prayer of the Hours at the Hagia Sophia and the church formed a safe-haven and a refuge for many of those who were unable to contribute to the city's defence, which comprised women, children, elderly, the sick, and the wounded. Being trapped in the church, the many congregants and yet more refugees inside became spoils-of-war to be divided amongst the Ottoman invaders. The building was desecrated and looted, with the helpless occupants who sought shelter within the church being enslaved. While most of the elderly, the infirm/wounded, and sick were killed, and the remainder (mainly teenage males and young boys) were chained up and sold into slavery.

The women of Constantinople also suffered from rape and sexual violence at the hands of Ottoman forces. According to historian Barbaro, "all through the day the Turks made a great slaughter of Christians through the city". According to historian Philip Mansel, widespread persecution of the city's civilian inhabitants took place, resulting in thousands of murders and rapes, and 30,000 civilians being enslaved or forcibly deported. George Sphrantzes says that people of both genders were raped inside the church of Hagia Sophia.

The first capitulation concluded between the Ottoman Empire and a foreign state was that of 1535, granted to the Kingdom of France. The Ottoman Empire was then at the height its power, and the French king Francis I had shortly before sustained a disastrous defeat at the Battle of Pavia. His only hope of assistance lay in the Ottoman sultan Suleiman I. The appeal to Suleiman on the ground of the common interest of the Kingdom of France and the Ottoman Empire in overcoming the power of the Holy Roman Emperor Charles V overweening power was successful; thus was established the Franco-Ottoman alliance, and in 1536 the capitulations were signed. They amounted to a treaty of commerce and a treaty allowing the establishment of Christian Frenchmen in Ottoman Turkey and fixing the jurisdiction to be exercised over them: individual and religious liberty was guaranteed to them, the King of France was empowered to appoint consuls in Ottoman Turkey, the consuls were recognized as competent to judge the civil and criminal affairs of French subjects in Ottoman Turkey according to French law, and the consuls may appeal to the officers of the sultan for their aid in the execution of their sentences. This, the first of the capitulations, can be seen as the prototype of its successors.

Anglican, American Presbyterian, and German Lutheran missionaries arrived in the Ottoman Empire in the 19th century. During the same period, there were nationalistic campaigns against Assyrians which often had the assistance of Kurdish paramilitary support. In 1915, Turks and Kurds massacred tens of thousands Assyrians in Siirt. Assyrians were attacked in the Hakkari mountains by the Turkish army with the help of Kurdish tribes, and many Christians were deported and about a quarter million Assyrians were murdered or died due to persecution. This number doubles if the killings during the 1890s are included. Kurds saw the Assyrians as dangerous foreigners and enforcers of the British colonizers, which made it justifiable to them to commit ethnic cleansing. The Kurds fought the Assyrians also due to fears that the Armenians, or European colonial powers backing them, would assume control in Anatolia. Kurdish military plundered Armenian and other Christian villages.

In the 1890s the Hamidiye (Kurdish paramilitary units) attacked Armenians in a series of clashes that culminated in the Hamidian massacres of 1894-1896 and the Adana massacre in 1909. It is estimated that between 80,000 and 300,000 Armenians were killed during these pre-War massacres. Into the 19th century, the Christians of Istanbul tended to be either Greek Orthodox, members of the Armenian Apostolic Church or Catholic Levantines.

First World War

During the tumultuous period of the First World War, up to 3 million indigenous Christians are alleged to have been killed. Prior to this time, the Christian population stood at around 20% -25% of the total. According to professor Martin van Bruinessen, relations between Christians and Kurdish and other Muslim peoples were often bitter and during World War I "Christians of Tur Abdin (in Turkey) for instance have been subjected to brutal treatment by Kurdish tribes, who took their land and even their daughters".

Kurdish-dominated Hamidiye slaughtered Christian Armenians in Tur Abdin region in 1915. It is estimated that ten thousand Assyrians were killed, and reportedly "the skulls of small children were smashed with rocks, the bodies of girls and women who resisted rape were chopped into pieces live, men were mostly beheaded, and the clergy skinned or burnt alive...." In 1915, Turks and Kurds plundered the Assyrian village of Mar-Zaya in Jelu and slaughtered the population, it is estimated that 7,000 Assyrians were slaughtered during this period. In September 1914 more than 30 Armenian and Assyrian villages were burnt by Kurdish and Turkish mobs in the Urmia region. After the Russian army retreated, Turkish troops with Kurdish detachments organized mass slaughters of Assyrians, in the Assyrian village of Haftvan 750 men were beheaded and 5,000 Assyrian women were taken to Kurdish harems. Turks and Kurds also slaughtered Christians in Diarbekir. There was a policy during the Hamidian era to use Kurdish tribes as irregulars (Hamidiye units) against the Armenians.

Treaty of Lausanne
The Greek forces who occupied Smyrna in the post-war period were defeated in the Turkish War of Independence which ended with the signing of the Treaty of Lausanne. Under the terms of the peace treaty, 1.3 million Christian residents of Turkey were relocated to Greece and around 400,000 Muslims were likewise moved from Greece to Turkey. When the Turkish state was founded in 1923 the remaining Greek population was estimated to be around 111,000; the Greek Orthodox communities in Istanbul, Gökçeada, and Bozcaada numbering 270,000 were exempted. Other terms of the treaty included various provisions to protect the rights of religious minorities and a concession by the Turks to allow the Greek Orthodox Patriarchate to remain in Istanbul.

Republic of Turkey (1923–present)

The BBC reported in 2014 that Turkey's Christian population had declined from 20% to 0.2% since 1914.

The U.S. Commission on International Religious Freedom (USCIRF) designated Turkey a "Country of Particular Concern" for religious freedom, noting “systematic limitations on the freedom of religion or belief” with respect to access to places of worship, religious education and right to train clergy. The report does note some areas of improvement such as better protection of the property rights of non-Muslims.

In the pre-war period American missionaries had been actively involved in the Ottoman education system. Many of the schools were closed down and suffered under stringent regulations and burdensome taxes during the country's secularization. Historically, these schools had worked with the Ottoman Empire's Christian communities, and were regarded with suspicion by the fledgling state.

A number of high-profile incidents targeting non-Muslims, including Christians, have occurred since the modern Turkish Republic was founded in 1923. During the Istanbul pogrom of 1955, non-Muslims (pejoratively called gayrimüslim) were attacked, harassed and killed by Turkish Muslims. In 2007, one German Protestant and two Turkish converts were tortured to death in Malatya by five men in the Zirve Publishing House murders. Turkish media called these killings the "missionary massacres".

In 2001, Turkey's National Security Council reported that it considers Protestant missionaries the third largest threat to Turkey's national security, surpassed only by Islamic fundamentalism and the Kurdish separatist organization PKK. A 2004 report by the Turkish Armed Forces (TAF) similarly recommended implementing new laws to curb missionary activity. According to the Turkish Evangelical Churches movement, Turkish Protestant churches had only 3,000 members in 2009—about half of these were converts from Islam, while the others were converts from Armenian and Syriac Christianity. Since Turkish nationality was often perceived exclusively as a Muslim identity after the Balkan Wars, the influence of Protestant missionaries on Turkey's Alevi population has been a concern since the era of Committee of Union and Progress rule. In 2016 the Association of Protestant Churches in Turkey released a report warning of an increase in anti-Christian hate speech.

Turkey's Christian community has been largely non-disruptive, with the notable exception of one convert, who hijacked Turkish Airlines Flight 1476 with the stated intent of flying it to the Vatican to meet the Pope and ask for his help to avoid serving in a "Muslim army".

In 2013, the Washington Post reported that members of the ruling Ak Parti had expressed their desires to convert Hagia Sophia into a mosque. Hagia Sophia, which is called ayasofya in Turkish, is an ancient church dating to 360 AD that was converted into a mosque after Mehmed II conquered Constantinople in 1453. It has been a museum since 1935. Patriarch Bartholomew objected to the government's rhetoric, saying "If it is to reopen as a house of worship, then it should open as a Christian church.” Also in 2013, the government announced that the 5th-century Monastery of Stoudios, located in Istanbul's Samatya neighborhood, would be converted into a mosque. The monastery, one of Byzantium's most important, was sacked during the Crusades and later served as a mosque for a time, until it was converted to a museum during the 20th century.

There is an ethnic Turkish Protestant Christian community in Turkey which number about 7,000–8,000 adherents most of them came from Muslim Turkish background. In 2003, Milliyet newspaper claimed that 35,000 Turkish Muslims had converted to Christianity.

Today the Christian population of Turkey is estimated at around 200,000- 320,000 Christians. 35,000 Catholics of varying ethnicities, 25,000 ethnic "Syriacs", (mostly followers of the Syriac Orthodox Church, the Assyrian Church of the East, and the Chaldean Catholic Church), 3,000–4,000 Greek Orthodox, 15,000–18,000 Antiochian Greeks and smaller numbers of Bulgarians, Georgians, and Protestants of various ethnicities.

According to Bekir Bozdağ, Deputy Prime Minister of Turkey, there were 349 active churches in Turkey in October 2012: 140 Greek, 58 Assyrian and 52 Armenian.

In 2015, the Turkish government gave permission for the Christian channel SAT-7 to broadcast on the government-regulated Türksat satellite.

Christian communities 

By the 21st century, Turkey's Greek Orthodox population had declined to only around 2,000–3,000. There are between 40,000 and 70,000 Christian Armenian citizens of Turkey.

The largest Christian population in Turkey is in Istanbul, which has a large community of Armenians and Greeks. Istanbul is also where the Patriarchate of Greek Orthodox Christianity is located. Antioch, located in Turkey's Hatay province, is the original seat of the namesake Antiochian Orthodox Church, but is now the titular see. The area, known for having ethnic diversity and large Christian community, has 7,000 Christians and 14 active churches. The city has one of the oldest churches in the world as well, called the Church of St Peter, which is said to have been founded by the Saint himself.

Tur Abdin is a large area with a multitude of mostly Syriac Orthodox churches, monasteries and ruins. Settlements in Tur Abdin include Midyat. The Christian community in Midyat is supplemented by a refugee community from Syria and has four operating churches. Some of the most significant Syriac churches and monasteries in existence are in or near Midyat including Mor Gabriel Monastery and the Saffron Monastery.

The Syriac Orthodox Church has a strong presence in Mardin. Many Syriacs left during the genocides in 1915.

By some estimates, in the early 2000s there were between 10,000 and 20,000 Catholics and Protestants in Turkey. Since 1960 a growing number of Muslims in Turkey are converting to Christianity, estimates range from 4,000 to 35,000 by various sources.

Archbishop Martin Kmetec told Aid to the Church in Need, in an interview, that ecumenical relations are generally good in the country. "In general, our relations with other Christian churches are good. The Ecumenical Patriarch of Constantinople, Bartholomew I, for example, has a good relationship with the Focolare Movement and the new Apostolic Vicar of Istanbul, Bishop Massimiliano Palinuro. Likewise, here in Izmir we get together with the Orthodox Christians, but also with the Anglicans, on various Christian feast days. Armenian priests recently celebrated an Armenian liturgy at our Catholic Church of St. Polycarp because they do not have their own church in Izmir. We also worked together with the Armenians in Izmir to open a small book shop for the Bible Society. These are promising signs of an ecumenical dialogue."

Churches in Turkey

Armenian Apostolic Church 

The Armenian Apostolic Church traces its origins to St. Gregory the Illuminator who is credited with having introduced the Armenian king Tiridates III to Christianity. It is one of the most ancient churches. Historically, the Armenian Church accepted only the first three Ecumenical Councils, rejecting the Council of Chalcedon in 451; its Christology is sometimes described as "non-Chalcedonian" for this reason. The Bible was first translated into the Armenian language by Mesrop Mashtots.

Turkey's Armenian Christian community is led by the Armenian Patriarchates of Istanbul and Jerusalem.  estimates of Turkey's Armenian Orthodox population range from between 50,000 and 70,000.

There are 35 churches maintained by the religious foundation in Istanbul and its surrounding areas. Besides Surp Asdvadzadzin Patriarchal Church (translation: the Holy Mother-of-God Armenian Patriarchal Church) in Kumkapi, Istanbul, there are tens of Armenian Apostolic churches. There are other churches in Kayseri, Diyarbakır, Derik, İskenderun, and Vakifli Koyu that are claimed by foundations as well. Around 1,000 Armenian churches throughout Turkey sit on public or privately owned land as well, with them all either being re-purposed or abandoned and/or in ruins.
 Armenian Catholic Church - There are several Armenian Catholic churches in Istanbul, including a large cemetery. In Mardin one remains as a Museum and occasional religious center.
 Armenian Evangelical Church - The Armenian Protestants have three churches in Istanbul from the 19th century.

Autocephalous Turkish Orthodox Patriarchate 

The Autocephalous Turkish Orthodox Patriarchate, also referred to as the Turkish Orthodox Church, is an unrecognized Eastern Orthodox Christian denomination based in Turkey. It was founded in Kayseri by Pavlos Karahisarithis, a supporter of the General Congregation of the Anatolian Turkish Orthodox, in 1922. Pavlos Karahisarithis became the Patriarch of this new Orthodox church, and took the name of Papa Eftim I. He was supported by 72 other Turkish Orthodox clerics.

The start of the Patriarchate can be traced to the Greco-Turkish War (1919–1922). In 1922 a pro-Turkish Eastern Orthodox group, the General Congregation of the Anatolian Turkish Orthodox, was set up with the support from the Orthodox bishop of Havza, as well as a number of other congregations representing a genuine movement among the Turkish-speaking, Orthodox Christian population of Anatolia who wished to remain both Orthodox and Turkish. There were calls to establish a new Patriarchate with Turkish as the preferred language of Christian worship.

In 1924, Karahisarithis started to conduct the Christian liturgy in Turkish, and quickly won support from the new Turkish Republic formed after the defeat and dissolution of the Ottoman Empire (1908–1922). He claimed that the Ecumenical Patriarchate of Constantinople was ethnically centered and favored the Greek population. Being excommunicated by the Greek Orthodox Church for claiming to be a bishop while still having a wife and due to the fact that married bishops are not allowed in Orthodoxy, Karahisarithis, who later changed his name into Zeki Erenerol, called a Turkish ecclesial congress, which elected him Patriarch in 1924.

Greek Orthodox Church 

Constantinople, capital of the Byzantine Empire from 330/395 to 1453 AD, became established in the ecclesiastical hierarchy at the Council of Constantinople in 381 AD. The legendary origins of the Patriarchate of Constantinople go back to St. Andrew, Metrophanes and Alexander of Constantinople. Constantinople's primacy over the Patriarchates of Alexandria and Antioch was reaffirmed at the Council of Chalcedon in 481, after which the papacy in Rome supported Constantinople in its dispute with Alexandria over monophysitism. Later, when Rome sought to assert its primacy over Byzantium, the Eastern Orthodox Church developed the doctrine of pentarchy as a response.

During the 8th and 9th centuries, Byzantium was embroiled in the Iconoclastic persecution. The Photian schism was also 9th century power struggle for the Patriarchate between Ignatios, backed by Pope Nicholas I, and Photios I of Constantinople.

The Byzantine Rite is similar to mass in the Catholic Church and the Divine Office (cycle of eight non-Mass services in the Catholic faith). In addition to the Hours of the Office, the Byzantine rite is used for sacraments (including marriage and baptism), ordination, funerals, blessings and other occasions.
The three divine liturgies of the Byzantine rite are John Chrysostom’s, Basil’s, and the Liturgy of the Presanctified Gifts.

Roman Catholic Church 

The Catholic Church in Turkey is represented by jurisdictions of Western and Eastern rites. Though the Armenian Apostolic Church was no longer in union with Rome and Byzantium after the Council of Chalcedon, a number of Armenians have converted to Catholicism over the years. After the Ottoman sultan Mahmud II extended formal recognition to Roman Catholics, an Armenian Catholic Patriarchate was established in Constantinople.

 Latin rite:
 Vicariate Apostolic of Istanbul, with seat in the Cathedral of the Holy Spirit, Istanbul. Basilica: St. Anthony of Padua Church in Istanbul, Istanbul. Jurisdiction: Immediately subjected to the Holy See
 Vicariate Apostolic of Anatolia, with seat in the Cathedral of the Annunciation, İskenderun, and Co-Cathedral of St. Anthony of Padua, Mersin. Jurisdiction: Immediately subjected to the Holy See
 Roman Catholic Archdiocese of Izmir, with seat in the St. John's Cathedral, Izmir.
 Armenian rite: Armenian Catholic Archdiocese of Istanbul. Cathedral: Holy Mother of God Armenian Cathedral Church, Istanbul. Jurisdiction: Immediately subjected to the Holy See.
 Byzantine Rite: Greek Catholic Apostolic Exarchate of Istanbul. Cathedral: Holy Trinity Greek Catholic Cathedral, Istanbul (Ayatriada Rum Katoliki Kilise). Jurisdiction: Immediately subjected to the Holy See.
 Syriac Rite: Syrian Catholic Patriarchal Exarchate of Turkey, with seat in Istanbul. Jurisdiction: Subject to the Syriac Catholic Church.
 Chaldaean Rite: Chaldean Catholic Archdiocese of Diarbekir. Cathedral: St. Mary's Cathedral, Diyarbakır, but with seat in Beyoğlu, Istanbul. Jurisdiction: Chaldean Catholic Church.

Syriac Orthodox Church 

The Syriac Orthodox Church, that follows the West Syriac Rite, was present in various southeastern regions of modern Turkey since the early medieval times. Since the 12th century, the patriarchal seat itself was transferred to Mor Hananyo Monastery (Deir al-Za`faran), in southeastern Anatolia near Mardin (modern Turkey), where it remained until 1924. In modern times, active churches are located in Istanbul, Diyarbakır, Adıyaman, and Elazığ. There are many both active and inactive churches in the traditionally Neo-Aramaic area of Tur Abdin, which is a region centered in the western area of Mardin Province, and has areas that go into Şırnak, and Batman Province. Up until the 1980s the Syriac population was concentrated there as well, but a large amount of the population has fled the region to Istanbul or abroad due to the Kurdish-Turkish conflict. The Church structure is still organized however, with 12 reverends stationed in churches and monasteries there. Churches were also in several other provinces as well, but during the Seyfo the churches in those churches were destroyed or left ruined.

In modern times, Syriac Orthodox Church hase these provinces in Turkey:
 Patriarchal Vicariate of Istanbul and Ankara under the spiritual guidance and direction of Archbishop Filüksinos Yusuf Çetin.
 Patriarchal Vicariate of Mardin under the spiritual guidance and direction of Archbishop Filüksinos Saliba Özmen.
 Patriarchal Vicariate of Turabdin under the spiritual guidance and direction of Archbishop Timotheus Samuel Aktaş.
 Archbishopric of Adıyaman under the spiritual guidance and direction of Archbishop Gregorius Melki Ürek.

Church of the East 

Historical Church of the East, that followed the East Syriac Rite, was present in various southeastern regions of modern Turkey throughout medieval and early modern times, and the continuation of that presence is embodied in the modern Assyrian Church of the East, and the Ancient Church of the East. Ecclesiastical structure of East Syriac Christianity in the region was almost completely wiped out in the Assyrian genocide. Originally, one of its main centers was in the region of Hakkari, in the village of Qodchanis, that was the seat of Shimun-line patriarchs from the 17th century up to the advent of modern times. Patriarch Mar Dinkha IV of the Assyrian Church of the East visited Turkey in 2012.

Protestant churches 

Armenian Protestants own 3 churches in Istanbul since the 19th century. There is an Alliance of Protestant Churches in Turkey. There are Protestant churches for foreigners in compounds and resorts, although they are not counted in lists of churches as they are used only by tourists and expatriates.

Church of England 

Anglicans in Turkey form part of the Eastern Archdeaconry of the Diocese of Gibraltar in Europe. In 2008 the Anglican bishop of Europe, Geoffrey Rowell, caused controversy by ordaining a local man to minister to Turkish-speaking Anglicans in Istanbul.

Evangelical churches 
The Armenian Evangelical Church was founded in 1846, after Patriarch Matteos Chouhajian excommunicated members of the "Pietisical Union" who had started to raise questions about a possible conflicts between the Biblical scriptures and Sacred traditions. The new church was recognized by the Ottoman government in 1850 after encouragement from the British Ambassador Henry Wellesley Cowley. There were reportedly 15 Turkish converts in Constantinople in 1864. One church minister said "We wanted the Turks first to become Armenian". Hagop A. Chakmakjian commented that "the implication was that to be Christian meant to be identified with the Armenian people".

The Church of Jesus Christ of Latter-day Saints 

Recognizing that present-day Ephesus of the New Testament endowed Turkey with historical importance, early leaders of the LDS Church preached in Ottoman Turkey in 1850, and—with the help of British LDS soldiers—organized a congregation in Istanbul in 1854. In 1979, another local community of LDS adherents was organized in Ankara.

List of church buildings in Turkey

Churches of the Armenian rite

Churches of the Byzantine and Greek Orthodox rite

Catholic churches

Churches of the Georgian rite

Protestant churches

Anglican churches

Other churches

Churches of the Syriac rite

See also 
 
 Armenians in Turkey
 Assyrians in Turkey
 Autocephalous Turkish Orthodox Patriarchate
 Catholic Church in Turkey
 Christianity and Islam
 Christianity in Cyprus
 Christianity in the Ottoman Empire
 Eastern Orthodoxy in Turkey 
 Freedom of religion in Turkey
 Human rights in Muslim-majority countries#Turkey
 Human rights in Turkey#Freedom of religion
 Irreligion in Turkey 
 Islam in Turkey
 Karamanlides, a Greek Orthodox Turkish-speaking people 
 Kurds in Turkey
 Nestorian rebellion
 Persecution of Christians in the Muslim world
 Protestantism in Turkey
 Religion in the Middle East
 Religion in Turkey
 Religious minorities in Turkey
 Secularism in Turkey

References

Sources

Further reading

External links 

Arestakes Simavoryan, CHRISTIANS IN TODAY’S TURKEY (Protestants and Catholics)
Turkish Christians Network